Macroglossum reithi is a moth of the family Sphingidae. It is known from Sulawesi.

References

Macroglossum
Moths described in 1997